This is a list of states of South Sudan by Human Development Index as of 2021.

See also 

 List of countries by Human Development Index

References 

South Sudan
South Sudan